Mandavadi is a village in Dindigul municipality, Tamil Nadu, India. The main occupation in Mandavadi is farming.

References

Villages in Dindigul district